The 2016 Asian Weightlifting Championships was held in Tashkent, Uzbekistan from April 22–30, 2016. It was the 46th men's and 27th women's championship.

Medal summary

Men

Women

Medal table 

Ranking by Big (Total result) medals 

Ranking by all medals: Big (Total result) and Small (Snatch and Clean & Jerk)

Team ranking

Men

Women

Participating nations 
258 athletes from 32 nations competed.

 (3)
 (4)
 (14)
 (10)
 (1)
 (15)
 (12)
 (8)
 (13)
 (13)
 (4)
 (2)
 (15)
 (1)
 (8)
 (15)
 (1)
 (3)
 (1)
 (10)
 (1)
 (8)
 (12)
 (8)
 (8)
 (6)
 (12)
 (14)
 (10)
 (15)
 (9)
 (2)

References

Results Book

External links
 
 Tournament website

Asian Weightlifting Championships
Asian Weightlifting Championships
Asian Weightlifting Championships
International weightlifting competitions hosted by Uzbekistan
Weightlifting in Uzbekistan
Sports competitions in Tashkent